Oncology Letters is a monthly peer-reviewed medical journal covering all aspects of oncology. It was established in 2010 and is published by Spandidos Publications. The editor-in-chief is Demetrios Spandidos (University of Crete). According to the Journal Citation Reports, the journal has a 2022 impact factor of 3.11, ranking it 97th out of 211 journals in the category "Oncology".

References

External links

Oncology journals
Publications established in 2010
Spandidos Publications academic journals
Monthly journals
English-language journals